Robert Luis Santos is an American statistician who is the director of the United States Census Bureau. He served as the 116th President of the American Statistical Association in 2021.

Early life and education 
Santos was born in San Antonio. After graduating from Holy Cross of San Antonio, he earned a Bachelor of Arts degree in mathematics from Trinity University and a Master of Arts in statistics from the University of Michigan.

Santos is of Mexican American heritage. He is the first nonwhite person to serve as permanent, Senate-approved director of the Census Bureau (James F. Holmes, a Black man, was acting director of the Census Bureau in the 1990s).

Career 
Santos has worked at the University of Michigan's Survey Research Center, NORC at the University of Chicago, and the Institute for Survey Research at Temple University. He was the 116th president of the American Statistical Association and a member of the National Center for Health Statistics board of counselors. Santos was the vice president for statistical methods and chief methodologist at the Urban Institute in Washington, D.C.

Santos was confirmed by the U.S. Senate on November 4, 2021, and was sworn in on January 5, 2022.

References 

Living people
American statisticians
Biden administration personnel
Directors of the United States Census Bureau
Trinity University (Texas) alumni
University of Michigan alumni
People from San Antonio
Fellows of the American Statistical Association
Presidents of the American Statistical Association
Year of birth missing (living people)
American people of Mexican descent
American academics of Mexican descent